Hellums kro (English: Hellum's Diner) is a Norwegian comedy-drama series that premiered in 2019 on NRK.

The setting is a fictional diner owned by Mr. Hellum (Finn Schau). The location is Nebbenes diner in Eidsvoll adjacent to the European route E6, which has outlets at both the northbound and southbound lanes (though in real life, the latter closed in 2017). These outlets are managed by Bjarte Tjøstheim and Gine Cornelia Pedersen's characters, who start a rivalry to become manager of the Hellum consortium. The rest of the cast are the staff at the two diners.

References

External links
Streaming

NRK original programming
2019 Norwegian television series debuts
2010s Norwegian television series
Norwegian television series
Comedy-drama television series